A Distant Land to Roam: Songs of the Carter Family is an album by American country singer Ralph Stanley, released in 2006. It was produced by Bob Neuwirth and Larry Ehrlich. T Bone Burnett, who previously worked with Stanley on his eponymous 2002 album, served as the album's executive producer. It was nominated for the Grammy Award for Best Traditional Folk Album at the 49th Grammy Awards.

Track listing
 God Gave Noah the Rainbow Sign
 Little Moses
 Worried Man Blues
 Longing for Home
 Motherless Children
 Storms Are on the Ocean
 Keep on the Firing Line
 Engine 143
 I'm Thinking Tonight of My Blue Eyes
 Poor Orphan Child
 On a Hill Lone and Grey
 Waves on the Sea
 Distant Land to Roam

References

Ralph Stanley albums
2006 albums
Albums produced by Bob Neuwirth
Columbia Records albums